The 2009–10 Bulgarian Cup was the 28th official season of the Bulgarian annual football knockout tournament. The competition began on September 16, 2009 with the matches of the preliminary round and ended with the final on May 5, 2010. Litex Lovech are the defending champions.

Beroe won the competition, beating Chernomorets Pomorie in the finals at Gradski. As such, they qualified for the third qualifying round of the 2010–11 UEFA Europa League.

Participating clubs
The following teams competed in the cup: (Teams in bold are still active in the competition)

1 Belasitsa Petrich was removed from West B PFG due lack of funding.
2 Chavdar Byala Slatina declined its participation on the tournament.
3 Spartak Pleven was removed from West B PFG on 10 March 2009 due lack of eligible players.
4 Lokomotiv Stara Zagora was removed from East B PFG on 3 August 2009 due lack of funding.
5 Rodopa Smolyan declined its participation on the tournament due lack of funding.

Preliminary round
In this round entered 4 winners from the regional competitions as well as 3 teams from B PFG (second level) decided by random draw. There should have been 4 teams selected from B PFG, but since this year's league features only 31 team, 3 teams were chosen. The matches were played on 16 September and 8 October 2009.

Note: Roman numerals in brackets denote the league tier the clubs participate in during the 2009–10 season.

First round
In this round entered winners from the previous round together with the remaining 28 teams from B PFG. The matches were played on 21 October 2009.

Second round
This round featured winners from the first round and all 16 teams from A PFG. The matches were played on 24, 25, November, 2, 3, 9 and 10 December 2009.

Third round
In this round entered winners from the second round. The matches were played on 12 and 13 December 2009.

Quarter-finals

Semi-finals

Final

External links
 bulgarian-football.com 

2009-10
2009–10 domestic association football cups
Cup